The European Technology Platform for Sustainable Chemistry (SusChem) is a European Technology Platform (ETP) initiative to improve the competitive situation of the European Union in the field of chemistry in three domains: Industrial Biotechnology, Materials Technology, and Reaction and Process Design.

The programme is a joint initiative (Public-Private Partnership) of the European Commission, representing the European Communities, and the industry. The main objective of the programma is to produce and implement a Strategic Research Agenda (SRA).

See also
 European Technology Platform
 Joint Technology Initiative

References
 European Technology Platform for Sustainable Chemistry
 REACH

External links
 European Technology Platform for Sustainable Chemistry

Science and technology in Europe
European Union and science and technology